{{Infobox person
| name        = Theodore von Eltz
| image       = Theodore von Elzt in The Four Feathers.jpg
| caption     = In The Four Feathers
| birth_date  = 
| birth_place = New Haven, Connecticut, U.S.
| death_date  = 
| death_place = Woodland Hills, Los Angeles, U.S.
| yearsactive = 1915-1957
| occupation  = Actor
| spouse      = Peggy Prior (1921-1928; divorced); 2 childrenElizabeth Lorimer (1932-1964) (his death)
| children    = 2, including Lori March
}}

Theodore von Eltz (November 5, 1893 – October 6, 1964) was an American film actor, appearing in more than 200 films between 1915 and 1957. He was the father of actress Lori March.

Von Eltz was a Yale University professor's son. After 12 years at an eastern private boarding school, he served in France for eight months during World War I. He followed his war experience with ventures into oil fields in Texas and on the stage in New York.

In September 1921, von Eltz married Peggy Prior. They had a daughter, Lori, and a son, Theodore, Jr. In 1928, the couple separated, reconciled, and finally divorced on November 7.

Filmography

 His Wife (1915) - Harry Dennys
 The Traffic Cop (1916) - Casey's Brother
 The Man Who Had Everything (1920) - Master of Ceremonies at Party (uncredited)
 Extravagance (1921) - Dick Vane
 The Old Nest (1921) - Stephen McLeod
 The Speed Girl (1921) - Tom Manley
 The Fourteenth Lover (1922) - Clyde Van Ness
 The Girl from Rocky Point (1922) - Robert Giffing
 Extra! Extra! (1922) - Fordney Stowe
 Sherlock Brown (1922) - Frank Morton
 Manslaughter (1922) - (uncredited)
 The Glorious Fool (1922) - Senior Surgical Interne
 Can a Woman Love Twice? (1923) - Thomas Jefferson Grant
 The Woman With Four Faces (1923) - Jim Hartigan
 Lights Out (1923) - 'Eggs'
 Tiger Rose (1923) - Bruce Norton
 The Breaking Point (1924) - Fred Gregory
 Being Respectable (1924) - Stephen O'Connell
 That French Lady (1924) - John Hemmingway
 The Turmoil (1924) - James Sheridan Jr.
 Hearts of Oak (1924) - Ned Fairweather
 Locked Doors (1925) - John Talbot
 On Thin Ice (1925) - Dr. Paul Jackson
 White Fang (1925) - Weadon Scott
 The Sporting Chance (1925) - Robert Selby
 The Thoroughbred (1925) - Robert Bemis
 Paint and Powder (1925) - Jimmy Evarts
 Broadway Lady (1925) - Bob Westbrook
 The Red Kimona (1925) - Freddy - the Chauffeur
 A Desperate Moment (1926) - Captain John Reynolds
 Queen o'Diamonds (1926) - Daniel Hammon
 The Last Alarm (1926) - Joe, Tom's Pal
 The Sea Wolf (1926) - Humphrey Van Weyden
 Laddie (1926) - Robert Paget
 Bardelys the Magnificent (1926) - René de Lesperon
 Fools of Fashion (1926) - Matthew Young
 His New York Wife (1926) - Philip Thorne
 Raggedy Rose (1926) - Minor Role (uncredited)
 Redheads Preferred (1926) - John Morgan
 The Nickel-Hopper (1926, Short) - Jimmy Jessop, Paddy's Rich Beau
 No Man's Law (1927) - Spider O'Day
 Perch of the Devil (1927) - Lord Mobray
 Great Mail Robbery (1927) - Lieutenant Donald Macready
 One Woman to Another (1927) - John Bruce
 Should Tall Men Marry? (1928, Short) - Teddy 
 The Way of the Strong (1928) - Dan
 Life's Mockery (1928) - Wade Fullerton
 Nothing to Wear (1928) - Phil Stanndish
 The Rescue (1929) - Carter
 The Voice of the Storm (1929) - Franklin Wells
 The Four Feathers (1929) - Lt. Castleton
 The Awful Truth (1929) - Edgar Trent
 The Very Idea (1929) - George Green
 The Furies (1930) - Lwen McDonald
 The Divorcee (1930) - Ivan (uncredited)
 The Arizona Kid (1930) - Dick Hoyt
 Sweeping Against the Winds (1930) - Unknown role
 Love Among the Millionaires (1930) - William Jordan
 Kismet (1930) - The Guide Nazir
 The Cat Creeps (1930) - Harry Blythe
 Inspiration (1931) - Normand (uncredited)
 The Prodigal (1931) - Carter Jerome
 Beyond Victory (1931) - Major Sparks
 The Secret Six (1931) - District Attorney Keeler
 Up Pops the Devil (1931) - Gilbert Morrell
 Five and Ten (1931) - Ramon (uncredited)
 Wicked (1931) - Tony Rande
 Susan Lenox (1931) - Kemper (uncredited)
 Once a Lady (1931) - Harry Cosden
 Heartbreak (1931) - Military Prosecutor
 West of Broadway (1931) - Tony (uncredited)
 Ladies of the Big House (1931) - Frazer
 A Private Scandal (1931) - Matthew Gray
 Hotel Continental (1932) - Jim Bennett
 The Wet Parade (1932) - Night Club Patron (uncredited)
 Huddle (1932) - Mr. Pearson (uncredited)
 The Midnight Lady (1932) - Byron Crosby
 Strangers of the Evening (1932) - Dr. Raymond Everette
 Drifting Souls (1932) - Joe Robson
 A Scarlet Week-End (1932) - The Husband
 The Red-Haired Alibi (1932) - Trent Travers
 Breach of Promise (1932) - District Attorney
 The Unwritten Law (1932) - Val Lewis
 Self Defense (1932) - Tim Reed
 No Other Woman (1933) - Sutherland
 Her Splendid Folly (1933) - Wallace Morley / John Ebbetts
 Luxury Liner (1933) - Exl
 Secrets (1933) - Robert Carlton
 High Gear (1933) - Larry 'Keyhole' Winston
 The Eleventh Commandment (1933) - Wayne Winters
 Pleasure Cruise (1933) - Murchison
 Kiss of Araby (1933) - Capt. J.G. Randall
 Bondage (1933) - Member of Review Board (uncredited)
 Jennie Gerhardt (1933) - Robert Kane
 Arizona to Broadway (1933) - Hubert Wayne
 Dance Girl Dance (1933) - Phil Norton
 Gigolettes of Paris (1933) - Albert Valraine
 Master of Men (1933) - Grenaker
 This Side of Heaven (1934) - Doctor (uncredited)
 Love Past Thirty (1934) - Charles Browne
 Change of Heart (1934) - Gerald Mockby
 Call It Luck (1934) - Nat Underwood
 Elinor Norton (1934) - Army Officer (uncredited)
 The Silver Streak (1934) - Ed Tyler
 Bright Eyes (1934) - J. Wellington Smythe
 Grand Old Girl (1935) - Mr. George S. Webster (uncredited)
 Private Worlds (1935) - Dr. Harding
 Behind the Green Lights (1935) - John C. Owen
 The Headline Woman (1935) - Johnny 'Full House' Corinti
 The Murder Man (1935) - James Spencer Halford (uncredited)
 Smart Girl (1935) - Fred Barton (uncredited)
 Trails of the Wild (1935) - Inspector Kincaid
 Streamline Express (1935) - (uncredited)
 His Night Out (1935) - Parsons
 Confidential (1935) - Mr. Walsh
 Three Kids and a Queen (1935) - Federal Man (uncredited)
 Rendezvous (1935) - Desk Clerk Assistant (uncredited)
 Magnificent Obsession (1935) - Dr. Preston
 Trails of The Wild (1935) - Inspector Kincaid
 Love Before Breakfast (1936) - Clerk (uncredited)
 The Road to Glory (1936) - Major
 Below the Deadline (1936) - Flash Ackroyd
 Ticket to Paradise (1936) - George Small
 Suzy (1936) - Revue Producer
 High Tension (1936) - Noble Harrison
 I Cover Chinatown (1936) - Clark Duryea
 Adventure in Manhattan (1936) - John Ridley - Henchman (uncredited)
 Under Your Spell (1936) - Cynthia's Lawyer (uncredited)
 Sinner Take All (1936) - David
 Mind Your Own Business (1936) - District Attorney Adams
 Beloved Enemy (1936) - Sean O'Brien
 A Man Betrayed (1936) - Burns
 Under Cover of Night (1937) - John Lamont
 Criminal Lawyer (1937) - Larkin's Attorney (uncredited)
 Clarence (1937) - Tobias
 Sea Devils (1937) - Court Martial Prosecutor (uncredited)
 Jim Hanvey, Detective (1937) - Dunn
 California Straight Ahead! (1937) - James Gifford
 The Emperor's Candlesticks (1937) - Adjutant to Prince Johann (uncredited)
 Topper (1937) - Hotel Manager
 The Firefly (1937) - Captain Pierlot (uncredited)
 Youth on Parole (1937) - Public Defender
 Stage Door (1937) - Elsworth (uncredited)
 The Westland Case (1937) - Robert Westland
 Stand-In (1937) - Sir Geoffrey - 'Sex and Satan' (uncredited)
 Fight for Your Lady (1937) - Wrestling Spectator (uncredited)
 Blondes at Work (1938) - District Attorney
 The Adventures of Marco Polo (1938) - Venetian Business Man (uncredited)
 Marie Antoinette (1938) - Officer in Entrance Hall (uncredited)
 Delinquent Parents (1938) - Carson
 Letter of Introduction (1938) - First Doctor - Midtown Hospital (uncredited)
 Smashing the Rackets (1938) - Howard Ellis (uncredited)
 I Am the Law (1938) - Martin - Club Owner (uncredited)
 Persons in Hiding (1939) - Attorney Jenson (uncredited)
 Pardon Our Nerve (1939) - Lucky Carson
 Inside Story (1939) - Whitey
 They Made Her a Spy (1939) - Colonel Page
 The Story of Vernon and Irene Castle (1939) - Minor Role (uncredited)
 The Sun Never Sets (1939) - Delafons
 5th Ave Girl (1939) - Terwilliger
 Full Confession (1939) - Prosecutor (uncredited)
 Legion of Lost Flyers (1939) - Bill Desert
 The Night of Nights (1939) - John (uncredited)
 Little Old New York (1940) - Washington Irving
 Dr. Ehrlich's Magic Bullet (1940) - Dr. Kraus
 Teddy, the Rough Rider (1940, Short) - William Loeb
 The Saint Takes Over (1940) - Shipboard Card Cheat (uncredited)
 A Dispatch from Reuters (1940) - Actor in 'Our American Cousin' (uncredited)
 The Old Swimmin' Hole (1940) - Baker, Grandpa's Lawyer
 Life with Henry (1940) - Mr. Rappaport (uncredited)
 The Son of Monte Cristo (1940) - Captain
 The Great Plane Robbery (1940) - Rod Brothers
 Kitty Foyle (1940) - Hotel Clerk (uncredited)
 Play Girl (1941) - Mr. Hunter (uncredited)
 Ellery Queen's Penthouse Mystery (1941) - Jim Ritter
 A Shot in the Dark (1941) - George Kilpatrick
 I'll Wait for You (1941) - Cassell
 Sergeant York (1941) - Prison Camp Commander (uncredited)
 A Tragedy at Midnight (1942) - Third Charles Miller (uncredited)
 The Great Man's Lady (1942) - Hank Allen (uncredited)
 Lady in a Jam (1942) - Dr. Elsworth (uncredited)
 The Man in the Trunk (1942) - Theodore Swann
 Quiet Please, Murder (1942) - Lucas (uncredited)
 Stand by for Action (1942) - 'Commander' (uncredited)
 Air Force (1943) - First Lieutenant (uncredited)
 Flight for Freedom (1943) - Cmdr. George (uncredited)
 The Bridge of San Luis Rey (1944) - Officer (uncredited)
 Follow the Boys (1944) - William Barrett
 Bermuda Mystery (1944) - Lee Cooper
 Since You Went Away (1944) - Hotel Desk Clerk (uncredited)
 The Unwritten Code (1944) - Major Spencer (uncredited)
 Hollywood Canteen (1944) - Canteen Director (uncredited)
 Rhapsody in Blue (1945) - Foley
 Saratoga Trunk (1945) - Hotel Manager (uncredited)
 The Big Sleep (1946) - Arthur Gwynn Geiger (uncredited)
 The Hucksters (1947) - Radio Voice (uncredited)
 Devil's Cargo (1948) - Thomas Mallon
 The Reformer and the Redhead (1950) - KWHE Radio Program Director (uncredited)
 Trial Without Jury (1950) - Philip Mannings
 Painting the Clouds with Sunshine (1951) - Whiteside (uncredited)
 Raiders of the Seven Seas (1953) - Sultan's Aide (uncredited)
 The Sea Around Us (1953) - Mr. Culpepper (scenes deleted)
 The Unholy Wife'' (1957) - McNeil, Fingerprint Expert (uncredited)

References

External links

1893 births
1964 deaths
American male film actors
American male silent film actors
Male actors from New Haven, Connecticut
Burials at Forest Lawn Memorial Park (Glendale)
20th-century American male actors